Mary Koncel is an American poet who has published three books of poetry. She is known for writing prose poetry.

Biography 
Koncel was born and raised in Chicago and holds a BFA in Poetry from Columbia College Chicago and MFA in English from MFA Program for Poets & Writers at the University of Massachusetts Amherst. She lives in Worthington, Massachusetts. Koncel teaches writing at Smith College, and is a writing consultant to Boston's Department of Public Health in the AIDS Bureau. Koncel is known for prose poetry that is a combination of humor and visual images.

Koncel is also involved with the American Wild Horse Campaign, a group that finds homes for horses and burros on public lands in the United States.

Grants and awards
 1996 - Poetry Grant, Massachusetts Cultural Council
 Finalist, the Norma Farber First Book Award

Bibliography

Books
 Closer to the Day (1999) - Quale Press
 You Can Tell The Horse Anything
 The Last Blonde - Hedgerow Books (2017)

Anthologies
 The Party Train: A Collection of North American Prose Poetry
 No Boundaries: Prose Poems by 24 American Poets (edited by Ray Gonzalez)
 The Best of the Prose Poem: An International Journal
 Real Things: An Anthology of Popular Culture in American Poetry
 Ladies, Start Your Engines: Women Writing on Cars and on the Road

Journal publications
 The Massachusetts Review
 The Journal
 The Illinois Review
 key satch(el)
 Denver Quarterly
 The Prose Poem: An International Journal

References

Living people
Year of birth missing (living people)
Columbia College Chicago alumni
University of Massachusetts Amherst MFA Program for Poets & Writers alumni
Smith College faculty
American women poets
Poets from Illinois
American women academics